The 2018 Balkan Athletics Indoor Championships was the 23rd edition of the annual track and field competition for athletes from the Balkans, organised by Balkan Athletics. It was held on 17 February 2018 at the Ataköy Athletics Arena in Istanbul, Turkey.

Romania topped the medal table, winning 15 medals including 5 gold, ahead of the host nation Turkey, and Bulgaria.

Men's results

Track

Field

Women's results

Track

Field

Medal table

References

External links
ABAF competition website
Men's results
Women's results

2018
Balkan Athletics Indoor Championships
Balkan Athletics Indoor Championships
2018 in Istanbul
Balkan Athletics Indoor Championships
Balkan Athletics Indoor Championships
International athletics competitions hosted by Turkey
Sports competitions in Istanbul